USS Kidd (DD-661), a , was the first ship of the United States Navy to be named after Rear Admiral Isaac C. Kidd, who died on the bridge of his flagship  during the 1941 Japanese attack on Pearl Harbor. Admiral Kidd was the first US flag officer to die during World War II and the first American admiral ever to be killed in action. A National Historic Landmark, she is now a museum ship, berthed on the Mississippi River in Baton Rouge, Louisiana, and is the only surviving US destroyer still in her World War II configuration.

World War II
Kidd (DD-661) was launched on 28 February 1943 by Federal Shipbuilding & Drydock Co., Kearny, New Jersey, sponsored by Mrs. Isaac C. Kidd, widow of Rear Admiral Kidd. The destroyer was commissioned on 23 April 1943. During her initial cruise to the Brooklyn Naval Shipyards, she sailed across New York Harbor with the Jolly Roger flying from the foremast. Subsequently, during outfitting, her crew adopted the pirate captain William Kidd as their mascot and commissioned a local artist to paint a pirate figure on the forward smokestack.

Arriving at Pearl Harbor on 17 September 1943, she got underway on 29 September, escorting aircraft carriers toward Wake Island for the heavy air attacks conducted on 6 October on Japanese installations located there, returning to Pearl Harbor on 11 October 1943.

Mid-October Kidd was underway with a task force to strike Rabaul and support the Bougainville landings. Upon reaching a strike position south of Rabaul on the morning of 11 November, the task force launched attacks upon Japanese positions on the island. During this rescue, a group of Japanese aircraft attacked the destroyer; Kidd shot down three attacking aircraft and completed the rescue while maneuvering to dodge torpedoes and bombs. Cmdr. Roby, her commanding officer, received the Silver Star for gallantry during this action. The destroyer returned to Espiritu Santo on 13 November.

Kidd next screened carriers making air attacks on Tarawa during the Gilbert Islands invasion from 19 to 23 November. On 24 November, she spotted 15 low-flying enemy bombers heading toward the heavy ships, gave warning, and shot down two Aichi D3A "Val" dive bombers. After Tarawa was secure, Kidd remained in the Gilbert Islands to support cleanup operations before returning to Pearl Harbor on 9 December.

On 11 January 1944 Kidd sailed for the forward area at Espiritu Santo, then sailed the next day for Funafuti, arriving on 19 January. During the invasion of the Marshall Islands from 29 January to 8 February, Kidd screened heavy ships and bombarded Roi and Wotje, then anchored at Kwajalein 26 February.

From 20 March to 14 April, Kidd guarded an airstrip under construction on Emirau and supported the occupation of Aitape and Hollandia in New Guinea 16 April to 7 May. She fought in the Marianas campaign from 10 June to 8 July and performed shore bombardment at Guam between 8 July and 10 August.

In need of repairs, Kidd sailed for Pearl Harbor, arriving on 26 August 1944. On 15 September, she departed Pearl, reached Eniwetok on 26 September, and arrived at Manus on 3 October. There she became part of the giant Philippines invasion fleet and entered Leyte Gulf on 20 October. Here, she screened the initial landings and provided fire support for soldiers who fought to reconquer the island until she sailed on 14 November for Humboldt Bay, New Guinea, arriving on 19 November. On 9 December Kidd headed toward Mare Island Navy Yard for overhaul and moored at Mare Island on Christmas Day.

Battle of Okinawa
Kidd sailed 19 February 1945, to join Task Force 58 (TF 58) for the invasion of Okinawa. Trained and battle-wise, Kidd played a key role during the first days of the Okinawa campaign, screening battleships, bombarding shore targets, rescuing downed pilots, sinking floating mines, providing early warning of raids, guarding the heavily damaged aircraft carrier , and helping to shoot down kamikazes.

That afternoon, a single enemy plane crashed into Kidd, killing 38 men and wounding 55. As the destroyer headed south to rejoin the task group, her fire drove off further enemy planes that were trying to finish her off. Stopping at Ulithi for temporary repairs, she got underway on 2 May for the West Coast, arriving at Hunter's Point Naval Shipyard on 25 May.

On 1 August 1945, Kidd sailed to Pearl Harbor and returned to San Diego, California 24 September 1945 for inactivation. She decommissioned on 10 December 1946 and entered the Pacific Reserve Fleet.

Korean War

When North Korea attacked South Korea, the United States called up a portion of its reserve fleet. Kidd was a part of that call and was recommissioned on 28 March 1951. The destroyer sailed to the Western Pacific on 18 June; and arrived at Yokosuka, Japan on 15 July. She joined Task Force 77 and patrolled off the Korean coast until 21 September, when she sailed for the East Coast of Korea. From 21 October to 22 January 1952, Kidd bombarded targets of opportunity from Wan-Do Island to below Koesong. She then sailed with Destroyer Division 152 to San Diego, arriving on 6 February 1952.

Kidd again got underway for Korea on 8 September 1952; joined the screen of a hunter-killer group near Kojo; and, in November, was back on bombardment missions off North Korea. Shortly after that, truce talks began. Kidd continued to patrol the Korean coast during negotiations. She departed the Far East on 3 March 1953 via Midway and Pearl Harbor and arrived in San Diego for overhaul on 20 March. Once the overhaul was completed, Kidd proceeded to Long Beach, California on 20 April 1953. The next day, the Swedish freighter Hainan collided with Kidd in Long Beach harbor requiring repairs that lasted until 11 May 1953.

Cold War
With the onset of the Cold War, from late 1953 to late 1959 Kidd alternated between West Pacific anti-Soviet submarine patrols with operations on the West Coast, making stops at Pearl Harbor and various ports in Japan, Okinawa, Hong Kong, and the Philippines. She visited Sydney, Australia, on 29 March 1958 and later that year entered the Taiwan Strait.

Kidd got underway on 5 January 1960 for the East Coast via the Panama Canal, arriving at Philadelphia, Pennsylvania on 25 January. From there, she made Naval Reserve training cruises to various East Coast ports. She joined fleet operating forces during the Berlin Crisis in 1961. December 1961 found Kidd patrolling off the Dominican Republic in a "show of force" patrol to provide an element of security in the troubled Caribbean.

Kidd arrived at Norfolk, Virginia on 5 February 1962 and joined Task Force Alfa for anti-submarine warfare (ASW) exercises. On 24 April, she was assigned to the Naval Destroyer School at Newport, Rhode Island. After a cruise to the Caribbean, on 1 July 1962, she resumed Naval Reserve training. Kidd was decommissioned on 19 June 1964, entered the Atlantic Reserve Fleet, and was berthed at the Philadelphia Shipyard.

Preservation

Louisiana congressman William Henson Moore selected Kidd to serve as a memorial for Louisiana World War II veterans. The other Fletcher-class museum ships; The Sullivans in Buffalo, New York; Cassin Young in Boston, Massachusetts; and in Palaio Faliro, Greece, HNS Velos, formerly .

Kidd was towed from Philadelphia and arrived in Baton Rouge on 23 May 1982, where she was transferred to the Louisiana Naval War Memorial Commission. She is now on public view as a museum vessel and hosts youth group overnight encampments. Kidd was never modernized and is the only Fletcher-class museum ship to retain its World War II appearance; she was restored to her August 1945 configuration and armament, culminating on 3 July 1997 when her torpedo tubes were reloaded. Kidds special mooring in the Mississippi River is designed to cope with the annual change in river depth, which can be up to forty feet. Half the year, she floats as the river rises; the other half, she sits on keel blocks, and her entire hull can be visible as the water is so low.

Awards
In 1986 Kidd was designated a National Historic Landmark, as the best-preserved World War II destroyer of her class.

U.S. Navy service awards
 Asiatic-Pacific Campaign Medal with eight battle stars 
 World War II Victory Medal 
 China Service Medal
 National Defense Service Medal with service star
 Korean Service Medal with four battle stars 
 Armed Forces Expeditionary Medal
 Philippine Presidential Unit Citation
 Korean Presidential Unit Citation
 Philippine Liberation Medal
 United Nations Korea Medal
 Korean War Service Medal (South Korea)

Post-military history

In 2018, Kidd was used as a stand-in for the fictional  USS Keeling (codenamed Greyhound), from C.S. Forester's novel The Good Shepherd, in its appearance in the book's cinematic adaptation, Greyhound. In 2022, Kidd appeared on the Disney+ series National Treasure: Edge of History.

See also
 List of National Historic Landmarks in Louisiana
 National Register of Historic Places listings in East Baton Rouge Parish, Louisiana

References

External links

 hazegray.org: USS Kidd
 USS Kidd Veterans Museum
W5KID – USS Kidd Amateur Radio Club 

Congressional Record (October 02, 2002) : Tribute to the World War II Men of the USS Kidd

 

World War II destroyers of the United States
Cold War destroyers of the United States
Korean War destroyers of the United States
Ships built in Kearny, New Jersey
Museum ships in Louisiana
National Historic Landmarks in Louisiana
Ships on the National Register of Historic Places in Louisiana
1943 ships
Museums in Baton Rouge, Louisiana
Military and war museums in Louisiana
Fletcher-class destroyers of the United States Navy
Tourist attractions in Baton Rouge, Louisiana
National Register of Historic Places in Baton Rouge, Louisiana